, better known by the stage name , is a Japanese voice actor and narrator represented by Aoni Production.

Notable voice work

Anime television series
Yuusei Kamen (Atlantar)
Sally the Witch (1966) (Akira Yamabe)
Cyborg 009 (1968) (002/Jet Link)
Kyoujin no Hoshi (Seiichi Shima)
Kick no Oni (Narration)
Space Carrier Blue Noah (Narration)

Anime films
Cyborg 009
Cyborg 009/Cyborg 009: Monster Wars (002/Jet Link)
Cyborg 009: Legend of the Super Galaxy (Narration)
Future War 198X (Narration)

Dub work
The FBI (Jim Rose)

Radio dramas
Toward the Terra (Soldier Blue, Narration)

Puppet shows
Uchuusen Shirika (Skipper Bob)
Supercar (Mike Mercury)
Captain Scarlet and the Mysterons (Doctor Fawn)

External links
 Ryō Ishihara at Aoni Production

Japanese male voice actors
1931 births
Living people
People from Kumamoto
Male voice actors from Kumamoto Prefecture
Aoni Production voice actors